Miikka Multaharju (born 9 October 1977) is a Finnish footballer.

He has played for Fredrikstad in the Norwegian Premier League,
Denizlispor in the Süper Lig and HJK Helsinki and MyPa in the Finnish Veikkausliiga.

Honours
 Norwegian Football Cup:1
2006

References
 Guardian Football

External links
 Profile at HJK.fi
 
 

1977 births
Living people
People from Lappeenranta
Finnish footballers
Finland international footballers
Myllykosken Pallo −47 players
Multaharju, Miika
Multaharju, Miika
Multaharju, Miika
Veikkausliiga players
Eliteserien players
Denizlispor footballers
Süper Lig players
Expatriate footballers in Turkey
Finnish expatriate footballers
Association football midfielders
Sportspeople from South Karelia